Jim Blair (23 February 1874 – 1 July 1953) was an Australian rules footballer who played with Collingwood in the Victorian Football League (VFL).

Notes

External links 
		
Jim Blair's profile at Collingwood Forever

1874 births
1953 deaths
Australian rules footballers from Melbourne
Port Melbourne Football Club players
Collingwood Football Club players
Footscray Football Club (VFA) players